The Sierra Nevada yellow-legged frog or Sierra Nevada Mountain yellow-legged frog (Rana sierrae) is a true frog endemic to the Sierra Nevada of California and Nevada in the United States. It was formerly considered Rana muscosa until a 2007 study elevated the more central and northern populations to full species status, restricting R. muscosa to the southern Sierra Nevada and southern California.

Once abundant in the Sierra Nevadas, the ecological effects of their loss have been significant as they were a keystone species and important for nutrient and energy cycling in the aquatic and terrestrial ecosystems.

Description

The Sierra Nevada yellow-legged frog is one of the two mountain yellow-legged frog species which include Rana sierrae and Rana muscosa. The Sierra Nevada yellow-legged frog (Rana sierrae) is very similar in appearance to the southern mountain yellow-legged frog (Rana muscosa), with which it was formerly identified. The two were separated into different species after there were observed differences in mitochondrial DNA. This species of frog is considered to be aquatic and is found within close proximity to water usually within a few meters. The frogs appear either yellow or brown and have both brown and black spots.  These spots can also become grey, red, or green through cryptic coloration. The belly of the frogs is more noticeably yellow and can also appear orange. Tadpoles of this species appear black or brown and take between one and four years to fully develop. On average, they grow up to 1.5 to 3.5 inches long and females tend to be larger than males.  The frogs lack vocal sacks, however, they can still vocalize by making a clicking sound both in and out of the water.  These frogs hibernate during the winter staying at the bottom of frozen lakes.  These frogs may only be active for around three months per year depending on the weather.

Sierra Nevada yellow legged frogs can also be grey, red, or greenish-brown with dark splotches. These splotches look like lichen or moss, making the frogs camouflaged; this type of coloration is cryptic coloration. The belly and the underside of the back legs are yellow, giving rise to the name.

If disturbed, these frogs can produce a garlic-like odor to ward off threats like predators.

Life Cycle 

Breeding for this species starts in spring which varies on the elevation of the area between April and July. Eggs are left in groups underwater with an average size of 233 eggs and are attached to something in the water. The eggs will then hatch between 18 and 21 days. The tadpoles which hatch from the eggs will then develop into adult frogs over a period ranging from 1 to 4 years. The frogs will then reproduce, therefore, repeating the cycle.

Oviposition occurs is shallow waters of ponds. Egg masses can be attached to ricks, gravel, vegetation, or under banks.

Habitat and Range 
These frogs inhabit mountain bodies of water such as streams, lakes, wetlands, and flooded meadows from 4,500 feet to 12,000 feet elevation. They spend most of their lives in or around these water sources as they provide essential food sources and raising ground for tadpoles. The frogs inhabit both the East and Western Sierras down to areas North of Lake Tahoe. Although their range has not changed, the population density of the species has declined over the years due to their endangered status as well as other threats to their habitat.

Adults can be found sitting on large rocks of the shoreline where there is little vegetation whole larvae are distributed in warm shallow areas of water during daytime

Breeding sites include ponds, lakes, and streams that do not dry out, are deep enough to prevent freezing, and are without fish.

Reproduction 
Sierra Nevada yellow-legged frogs reproduce in the water.  Once adults are matured, male frogs will call for a mate and upon the arrival of a female the male will grasp their back and release sperm as the female releases eggs.  Fertilization occurs outside the body and 100-350 eggs can be laid at one time.  Eggs are laid in shallow water and are not attached to anything but can become attached to vegetation or rocks in moving water.  Eggs must be laid in areas where the water does not freeze over winter in order for the tadpoles to survive.  If the water was to freeze in a breeding zone it could lead to the deaths of three to four generations of tadpoles.

Conservation status
The Sierra Nevada yellow-legged frog has been declared vulnerable by the IUCN. Studies showed that 92.5% of the species populations have gone extinct. These declines have been caused in most part by disease and invasive predators. Shallow lakes that dry in summer endanger this high-elevation frog. Predation by non-native trout also plays a large role in limiting breeding and tadpole development. The trout eat many of the tadpoles that are produced while also competing against adult frogs for resources. Areas containing trout have seen major declines in the frog population and experiments have shown that the removal of the trout leads to a rise in the frog population. Many factors endangering the southern mountain yellow-legged frog also affect this species. A disease called chytridiomycosis has led to the extinction of entire populations of the species. This disease is caused by Batrachochytrium dendrobatidis or bd. Populations that have been infected by the disease have either been eradicated or reduced to a few individuals.  This species also suffers from habitat fragmentation since populations of the frogs have become separated from one another.

Studies show that a recently discovered amphibian chytrid fungus is contributing to the decline of the Sierra yellow-legged frog. Chytrid fungus leads to Chytridiomycosis, a disease than can be fatal. Chytrid fungus lives on keratin which is found on the external mouthparts of tad poles and the outer skin layer of adults. The growth of this fungus on adults disrupts the species ability to breathe through its skin and osmoregulate. More research on the origins and spread of chytrid fungus is still needed.

Conservation Strategies

Yosemite 
In 2006, Yosemite National Park began a Yosemite Conservancy supported protect to introduce frogs into lakes without fish. In 2007, a project was started to restore frog habitat by removing non-native fish from remote sites. Once the site is fishless, lakes are inhabited by native species, including the Sierra Nevada yellow-legged frog.

Notes

External links

Californiaherps.com: Rana sierrae — Sierra Nevada Yellow-legged Frog

Rana sierrae recordings

References 

 Us, Phone: 209/372-0200 Contact. "Sierra Nevada Yellow-Legged Frog - Yosemite National Park (U.S. National Park Service)". www.nps.gov. Retrieved 2021-11-12.
 Office, Veronica Davison, veronica_davison@fws gov, External Affairs Division, Sacramento Fish & Wildlife. "Sierra Nevada Yellow-Legged Frog - Amphibians and Reptiles, Endangered Species Accounts | Sacramento Fish & Wildlife Office". Sacramento Fish and Wildlife. Retrieved 2021-11-12.
 "Mountain Yellow-legged Frog". wildlife.ca.gov. Retrieved 2021-11-13.

Rana (genus)
Amphibians of the United States
Fauna of the Sierra Nevada (United States)
Endemic fauna of California
Endemic fauna of Nevada
Endangered fauna of California
Endangered fauna of the United States
Amphibians described in 1917
ESA endangered species
Wikipedia Student Program